Ryan Powell may refer to:

 Ryan Powell (lacrosse) (born 1978), American lacrosse player
 Ryan Powell (rugby league) (born 1982), Australian rugby league player
 Ryan Powell (rugby union) (born 1980), Welsh rugby union player